Leidseplein (English: Leiden Square) is a square in central Amsterdam, Netherlands. It lies in the Weteringschans neighborhood (Centrum borough), immediately northeast of the Singelgracht. It is located on the crossroads of the Weteringschans, Marnixstraat and Leidsestraat.

Leiden Square 
Leidseplein is one of the busiest centres for nightlife in the city. Historically, the square was the end of the road from Leiden; it served as a parking lot for horse-drawn traffic. Today, modern traffic travels through the square and side streets are packed with restaurants and nightclubs. The Stadsschouwburg, a national-renowned theatre, is the most notable architectural landmark on the square; the American Hotel is close by.

2022 hostage crisis 
On February 22, 2022, a 27 year old man took at least one person hostage inside of an Apple Store in Leiden Square. After a forced breach of the store by Dutch Police, all hostages were safely rescued. However, as a result of the breach, the hostage taker was killed. It is 36.5 kilometers from Alphen aan den Rijn, where in 2011, a shooting at a shopping mall took place, and approximately 150 meters from where the murder of well known crime reporter Peter R. de Vries, a key figure in the Marengo trial occurred.

Panorama

See also

List of tourist attractions in Amsterdam

References

Squares in Amsterdam